Shared may refer to:
 Sharing
 Shared ancestry or Common descent
 Shared care
 Shared-cost service
 Shared decision-making in medicine
 Shared delusion, various meanings
 Shared government
 Shared intelligence or collective intelligence
 Shared library
 Shared morality
 Shared ownership
 Shared parenting or shared custody
 Shared property
 Shared reading
 Shared secret
 Shared services
 Shared universe, in fiction
 Shared vision planning, in irrigation
 Shared workspace

Science and technology
 Shared medium, in telecommunication
 Shared neutral, in electric circuitry
 Shared pair, in chemistry
Shared vertex (or shared corner or common corner), point of contact between polygons, polyhedra, etc.
Shared edge, line of contact between polygons, polyhedra, etc.

Computing
 Shared agenda, in groupware
 Shared computing
 Shared desktop
 Shared data structure
 Shared IP address
 Shared memory architecture
 Shared memory (interprocess communication)
 Shared resource
 Shared read lock
 Shared Source Initiative
 Shared web hosting service

Transportation
 Shared space, in civil engineering
 Shared lane marking
 Shared Zone
 Shared transport
 Share taxi

Companies
 Shared Experience, a British theatre company

Geography
 Shared, Iran, a village in Qazvin Province

See also
 
 
 Share (disambiguation)
 Shard (disambiguation)